Big Brother 2001, also known as Big Brother 1, was the first season of the Australian reality television series Big Brother. It is based upon the Dutch series of the same name, it premiered on Network Ten on 23 April 2001 and lasted twelve weeks until the live finale on 16 July 2001. Big Brother 1 proved to be an early ratings success. In total, the season averaged 1.4 million viewers, thus making it the fourth highest rated season to date. This season aired for a total of 85 days, with evictions occurring once every week beginning with the second week. In total, fourteen Housemates competed in Big Brother 1. The original twelve entered on the first night, with two intruders entering at a later date. Ultimately, Housemate Ben Williams was later announced as the winner of the series, with Blair McDonough becoming the Runner-Up.

The premise of the show remained largely unchanged from other installments of the series. Big Brother revolves around ten strangers living in a house together with no communication with the outside world. They are filmed constantly during their time in the house, and can have no communication with those filming them. Each week, each contestant, referred to as "Housemates", choose two people to be up for nomination. The three (or more) people with the most votes will be nominated to leave the house. The viewers then decide which of the nominees should leave, with the selected person leaving during a live show. This process continued until only three Housemates remained, in which the viewers would decide which of the Housemates would win the grand prize. A Housemate can be ejected from the show for breaking rules, such as discussing nominations when not permitted.

The Finale was watched by 2.789 million Australian viewers.

Production

Broadcast
Shortly before the premiere of the season, a special entitled Big Brother Revealed aired, featuring information on the casting process and the development of the house. The series held a live launch on 23 April 2001. The contestants were recorded 24 hours a day with cameras fixed around the house, and had to wear portable microphones. Each night, Network Ten broadcast a daily highlights show, and from the second week there was a live eviction show hosted by Gretel Killeen, where the evicted Housemate was interviewed. The nominations aired during the daily highlights show during this season, making it the only season to not feature a live nominations special. This season also aired alongside the Big Brother Saturday spin-off series. This was an hour-long special that aired on Saturday evenings, with Gretel Killeen presenting an overview of press discussions of the series that week. The series also featured interviews with fans, which were conducted by reporter Sami Lukis. News about the previously evicted Housemates was also featured on this special. Big Brother Saturday was not featured in any subsequent seasons. The season concluded on 16 July 2001, lasting for a total of 85 days. This ties Big Brother 1 and Big Brother 8 as being the shortest edition of the series until Big Brother 11.

Prizes
The fourteen Housemates in the game were competing for the grand prize of $250,000. Each week, the Housemates attempted to complete various tasks assigned by Big Brother in exchange for a weekly budget, which they used to buy food and luxuries; this included buying things such as alcohol. Big Brother 1, unlike other editions of the series, did not feature luxury competitions or prizes throughout the series.

House
The House used for Big Brother 1 was located inside of Dreamworld. The House featured a total of 25 cameras and 32 microphones in the various rooms and backyard. The house for the first series was very basic, as part of the theme of the series. The House featured a living room, which had a fireplace for the Housemates to use, and a kitchen, which featured a stove and sink, along with the fridge. There was a large dining table in the kitchen, with room for all of the Housemates. Various two way mirrors are in the house, with a camera crew behind him. The House also featured two bedrooms, with each bedroom featuring six beds. The first bedroom had a double bed and featured blue walls and orange sheets. The bathroom featured blue tile flooring and a clear shower. Housemates could communicate with producers in the room known was the "Diary Room". The Diary Room in this season featured yellow walls and an orange chair, and had a simplistic design. This was where nominations took place, and where Housemates could reveal their thoughts. Housemates could be seen by a medical professional in the Diary Room if necessary. Furniture and homewares in the house were provided by Freedom Furniture.
The outside of the House featured a chicken coop with various chickens inside, from which the Housemates collect eggs. The Housemates were also given a swimming pool in the backyard to use. There was also a garden in the backyard, which featured a vegetable patch which the Housemates could use.

Format
The format used for Big Brother in Australia remained largely unchanged from that featured in other editions of the series, though some differences were incorporated. Big Brother is a game show in which a group of contestants, called Housemates, live in isolation from the outside world in a custom built "house", which includes everyday facilities such as a fully equipped kitchen, garden, two bedrooms, and a bathroom. The house is also a television studio with cameras and microphones in most of the rooms to record the activities of the Housemates. The only place where Housemates can escape the company of the other contestants is the Diary Room, where they are encouraged to voice their true feelings. Not all Diary Room footage is broadcast due to the privacy of the contestants. Each week all Housemates nominate two of their fellow contestants for potential eviction. They award two points to one Housemate, and one point to another. Failure to do so may result in a punishment, such as a reduction in the prize fund. The three, or more, Housemates with the highest number of nominations face a public vote conducted by phone, with the contestant receiving the most votes being evicted from the house. The last contestant remaining in the house is declared the winner and is awarded a cash prize of $250,000. On eviction night, host Gretel Killeen would inform the nominees which of them had been evicted from the house. Following the announcement, the evicted Housemate had to gather their belongings and exit the house. Upon exiting through the house's front door, Killeen led the evictee into a studio where they met with their family and friends. While in the studio, Killeen had an interview with the evicted Housemate, and showed their best bits - a video compilation of their time in the house.

Over the duration of the series, the Housemates were given a series of tasks by Big Brother which tested them in many ways. They were also put to the test by their own ideals, prejudices and opinions against other people from different walks of life; something that has survived from the original "social experiment" of Big Brother 1. They lived in the communal House and shared cooking and cleaning chores amongst themselves. Housemates were forbidden to sleep during daylight hours (unless unwell) - Big Brother plays the wake-up call persistently in the morning if Housemates do not wake up and will play an alarm clock noise into the house if a Housemate falls asleep during the day. Housemates must also live by the fundamental rules of Big Brother; if the rules are broken it can result in formal warnings, various punishments or even a Housemate's removal from the game. They must wash their own clothes by hand, and they have to make their own bread from scratch. Each week Big Brother sets the Housemates a task in order to determine the shopping budget for the following week. They must work together to win the tasks in order to win a luxury shopping budget which changed based on the number of people remaining in the house. If all food runs out in the House, Big Brother provides emergency rations of chickpeas and rice. Housemates were responsible for their own shopping and decide which items the budget will allow them to have. Only a small percentage of the overall budget can be spent on alcohol.

Big Brother 1 featured some twists to the format throughout the course of the season. On Day 36, Housemates Anita and Rachel entered the house as intruders. Though they were official Housemates, they learned that they were automatically nominated for eviction. Their fellow Housemates then decided which of the two should be evicted from the house, and the Housemate with the most votes was then evicted. The survivor of the eviction was then given immunity from the following round of nominations. Yet another twist in the format occurred on Day 84, only a day before the season finale, when the Housemate who had come in third place was evicted from the house. The finale occurred on the final day, with only two of the three finalists remaining in the house.

Housemates

Nominations table 
The first housemate in each box was nominated for two points, and the second housemate was nominated for one point.

Notes

: On Day 36, intruders Anita and Rachel entered the house as intruders. The intruders faced a house eviction vote. As Rachel received the majority of the votes, she was evicted from the house.
: Due to surviving the intruder eviction, Anita could not nominate or be nominated.
: Jemma was banned from nominating this week.
: There were no nominations in Week 12. The final three housemates faced the Australia's vote,
: For the finale, Australia voted to evict between the final two housemates. The winner of Big Brother Australia 2001 and the $250,000 grand prize would be the finalist with the fewest votes to evict.

Special shows

Intruder Alert

Intruder Eviction

Mastercard $100,000 Challenge

The Final Sunday Eviction

Weakest Link Special Episode
On 27 August 2001, a special episode of the Seven Network game show The Weakest Link went to air featuring nine contestants from the first season. The results were as follows:

Note that the following are regarding the contestant, not the contestant the contestant votes against:
 Red indicates the contestant was the weakest link
 Lime indicates the contestant was the strongest link

1 Todd, Sharna and Anita tied with two votes each, but as Sharna was the strongest link, and could not vote herself off, she opted to vote Todd off.

2 Johnnie and Sharna tied with two votes each, but as Jemma was the strongest link, she opted to vote Johnnie off, though she originally voted for Gordon who was not part of the tie.

Ben was first eliminated for being too greedy. Rachel was next for not answering any questions correctly. Andy followed for not answering enough questions correctly. Todd was voted out on a countback also for not answering any questions correctly. Johnnie was eliminated on a countback for not banking any money nor answering enough questions correctly. Jemma was voted out for being too big a threat to the team. Sharna was voted out also for being too big of a threat to the team. In the end, Gordon defeated Anita in the head-to-head round.

The final total won was $31,600.

Bibliography

References

2001 Australian television seasons
01